Thomas F. McHugh (May 13, 1932 – November 27, 2019) was an American gridiron football player and coach and college baseball coach. He was a standout player at the University of Notre Dame where he was a member of the undefeated 1953 Notre Dame Fighting Irish football team under head coach Frank Leahy. McHugh served as the head football coach at Kenyon College in Gambier, Ohio from 1978 to 1982, compiling a record of 18–27. He served as the head baseball coach at Kenyon from 1968 to 1983.

McHugh was selected by the Chicago Cardinals in the 1954 NFL Draft.

As a high school coach at Central Catholic High School in Toledo, Ohio, McHugh coached future Michigan State and National Football League (NFL) star Bubba Smith. He was the brother of Toledo mayor John McHugh.

Head coaching record

College football

References

1932 births
Living people
American football fullbacks
American players of Canadian football
Notre Dame Fighting Irish football players
Ottawa Rough Riders players
Kenyon Lords baseball coaches
Kenyon Lords football coaches
High school football coaches in Ohio
Sportspeople from Toledo, Ohio
Coaches of American football from Ohio
Players of American football from Ohio
Baseball coaches from Ohio